The Sheridan County Fairgrounds Historic District, in Sheridan, Wyoming, includes works built in 1923.  It was listed on the National Register of Historic Places in 2011.  It included six contributing buildings.

It includes a 1923-built brick Exhibit Hall, three c.1939 Works Progress Administration-built sandstone buildings, a frame barn from the 1930s, and a frame horse stalls from 1950.

The most significant building is the sandstone octagonal Pavilion, which is also known as the Sale Barn, built during 1935–39.

The fairgrounds are upon a  site that was bought in 1906 by the Sheridan County Fair Association.  The land had originally been homesteaded in 1895.

References

Fairgrounds in the United States
Historic districts on the National Register of Historic Places in Wyoming
National Register of Historic Places in Sheridan County, Wyoming
Buildings and structures completed in 1923